GRASP is a well known SAT instance solver. It was developed by João Marques Silva, a Portuguese computer science researcher. It stands for Generic seaRch Algorithm for the Satisfiability Problem.

External links
 GRASP home page

References 

SAT solvers